The Offering is a 2023 American horror-thriller film directed by Oliver Park and with a screenplay by Hank Hoffman from a story by Hoffman and Jonathan Yunger, based on the Jewish folktale of Abyzou. It stars Nick Blood, Emily Wiseman, Allan Corduner, Paul Kaye, Daniel Ben Zenou and Jodie Jacobs.

Premise
In a Hasidic community, an ancient demon attacks a family struggling with unresolved trauma.

Cast
 Nick Blood as Arthur 
 Emily Wiseman as Claire 
 Allan Corduner as Saul
 Paul Kaye as Heimish
 Daniel Ben Zenou as Chayim
 Jodie Jacobs as Chana
 Sofia Weldon as Sarah Scheindal
 Anton Trendafilov as Yosille
 Velizar Binev as Moishe
 Meglena Karalambova as Aida 
 Jonathan Yunger as Levi Siegelman

Production
In June 2020, Oliver Park was reported to be directing the film in his feature directorial debut. Under the working title Abyzou, filming began on January 25, 2021, at Nu Boyana Film Studios, in the midst the COVID-19 pandemic in Bulgaria. Safety measures the production crew followed included mask wearing and regular COVID tests and temperature checks.

The film was released by Decal on January 13, 2023.

Reception 
On the review aggregator website Rotten Tomatoes, the film holds an approval rating of 79% based on 42 reviews. The site's consensus reads: "Within the outline of it's fairly standard story, The Offering puts a unique--and often genuinely scary--spin on demonic possession horror tropes". On Metacritic, the film has a weighted average score of 60 out of 100, based on 7 critics, indicating "mixed or average reviews".

In a review for Variety, Dennis Harvey described The Offering as "a lively but cluttered pileup of jump scares with too few original ideas". Comparing it to 2019's The Vigil, Harvey referred to the film as the "showier affair of the two" and points out that it lacks The Vigil's "atmospheric dread and psychological plausibility, resulting in a jump-scare-riddled contraption ultimately more cheesy than frightening." He praised the production design and camerawork, and stated that most of the actors "do decent work". He criticized The Offering's "short-attention-spanned, obvious overall approach, which sacrifices credibility for increasingly cluttered, ineffectual shocks" and concludes his review by stating that The Offering is at no risk of being boring, but is "just too much".

Brian Tallerico of RogerEbert.com gave the film 2.5 out of 4 stars, referring to it as a "surprisingly strong genre alternative". He noted that the "performances are a mixed bag", with the older actors seeming to "understand the assignment" better than their younger counterparts. Tallerico also criticized the brightness level on certain scenes, describing the film as "often too well-lit".

Christian Zilko of IndieWire gave the film a grade of A− and praised its craftsmanship and production design. He wrote: "There's no shortage of great movies about exorcising demons from people's bodies, but this might be the best film about trying to keep one in". Marco Vito Oddo of Collider gave the film a B, stating that  "The Offering won’t get any points for originality, but people looking for well-crafted horror can’t go wrong with Park’s latest film". He pointed out that The Offering was "too reliant on jumpscares" but went on to praise Allan Corduner and Paul Kaye's performances and noted that despite its lack of originality, it still delivered "good-old fashion horror fun".

References

Jewish folklore
Works about folklore
2023 horror films
2023 films
Films about Orthodox and Hasidic Jews
Films scored by Christopher Young
2023 directorial debut films

External links